Pusia hansenae is a species of sea snail, a marine gastropod mollusk, in the family Costellariidae, the ribbed miters.

Distribution
This marine species occurs off Western Australia.

References

External links
 Cernohorsky W.O. (1973). Description of new West Australian Mitridae and Vexillidae (Mollusca: Gastropoda). Records of the Auckland Institute and Museum. 10: 133-142

hansenae